Rajesh Kumar may refer to:

 Rajesh Kumar (actor)
 Rajesh Kumar (air marshal), an officer in the Indian Air Force
 Rajesh Kumar (soldier)
 Rajesh Kumar Agrawal, judge on the Supreme Court of India
 Rajesh Kumar Manjhi,  politician
 Rajesh Kumar (Madhya Pradesh politician)
 Rajesh Kumar Grover, oncologist
 Rajesh Kumar (IPS), the former Commissioner of Police, Kolkata
 Rajesh Kumar (wrestler) (born 1969), Indian Olympic wrestler
 Rajesh Kumar (writer), author of crime fiction

See also
Raj Kumar (disambiguation)